

P

References